Brederode may refer to:

 Dutch ship Brederode, flagship of the Dutch fleet in the First Anglo-Dutch War
 Castle Brederode, a ruined castle near Santpoort-Zuid, Netherlands
 Frans van Brederode (1465–1490), who conquered Rotterdam in 1488 during the Hook and Cod wars
 Henry, Count of Bréderode (1531–1568), who was an early leader of Les Gueux
 Gerbrand Adriaensz Bredero (1585–1618), Dutch poet whose name is sometimes misspelled Brederode
 Van Brederode, a Dutch noble family